The following radio stations broadcast on AM frequency 880 kHz: 880 AM is classified as a North American clear-channel frequency by the Federal Communications Commission; WCBS in New York City is the dominant Class A station on 880 kHz.

In Argentina 
 Democracia in Longchamps, Buenos Aires.

In Brazil 
 Rádio Inconfidência in Belo Horizonte, Minas Gerais.

In Canada

In Mexico 
 XEV-AM in Chihuahua, Chihuahua

In the United States 
Stations in bold are clear-channel stations.

References

Lists of radio stations by frequency